This list of ancient watermills presents an overview of water-powered grain-mills and industrial mills in classical antiquity from their Hellenistic beginnings through the Roman imperial period.

The watermill is the earliest instance of a machine harnessing natural forces to replace human muscular labour (apart from the sail). As such, it holds a special place in the history of technology and also in economic studies where it is associated with growth.

The initial invention of the watermill appears to have occurred in the hellenized eastern Mediterranean in the wake of the conquests of Alexander the Great and the rise of Hellenistic science and technology. In the subsequent Roman era, the use of water-power was diversified and different types of watermills were introduced. These include all three variants of the vertical water wheel as well as the horizontal water wheel. Apart from its main use in grinding flour, water-power was also applied to pounding grain, crushing ore, sawing stones and possibly fulling and bellows for iron furnaces.

An increased research interest has greatly improved our knowledge of Roman watermill sites in recent years. Numerous archaeological finds in the western half of the empire now complement the surviving documentary material from the eastern provinces; they demonstrate that the breakthrough of watermill technology occurred as early as the 1st century AD and was not delayed until the onset of the Middle Ages as previously thought. The data shows a wide spread of grain-mills over most parts of the empire, with industrial mills also being in evidence in both halves. Although the prevalence of grain-mills naturally meant that watermilling remained a typically rural phenomenon, it also rose in importance in the urban environment.

The data below spans the period until ca. 500 AD. The vast majority dates to Roman times.

Earliest evidence 
Below the earliest ancient evidence for different types of watermills and the use of water-power for various industrial processes. This list is continued for the early Middle Ages here.

Written sources 
In the following, literary, epigraphical and documentary sources referring to watermills and other water-driven machines are listed.

Graphical representations 
This section deals with depictions of watermills which are preserved in ancient paintings, reliefs, mosaics, etc.

Archaeological finds

Watermill sites 
Below are listed excavated or surveyed watermill sites dated to the ancient period.

Millstones 
The following list comprises stray finds of ancient millstones. Note that there is no way to distinguish millstones driven by water-power from those powered by animals turning a capstan. Most, however, are assumed to derive from watermills.

Water wheels and other components 
Although more rare than the massive millstones, finds of wooden and iron parts of the mill machinery can also point to the existence of ancient watermills. Large stone mortars have been found at many mines; their deformations suggest automated crushing mills worked by water wheels.

References

Notes

Sources 
Watermill lists which summarize the rapidly developing state of research are provided by Wikander 1985 and Brun 2006, with additions by Wilson 1995 and 2002. Spain 2008 undertakes a technical analysis of around thirty known ancient mill sites.

Further reading

External links 

Traianus – Technical investigation of Roman public works
The Oxford Roman Economy Project: The uptake of mechanical technology in the ancient world: the water-mill – Quantitative data on watermills up to 700 AD

Watermills
Ancient